The Journal of Food Processing and Preservation is a peer-reviewed scientific journal that covers research into food processing and preservation. It is published by Wiley-Blackwell. The journal moved to online-only publication in 2011.

References

External links 
 

Bimonthly journals
Wiley-Blackwell academic journals
English-language journals
Publications established in 1977
Food science journals
Food processing